Dinner in Caracas II is a 33-RPM LP album by Venezuelan composer/arranger/conductor Aldemaro Romero, released in 1966, under contract with RCA Victor.

This album is the second volume of the 1955 Dinner in Caracas, as part of the modernization of Venezuelan folk music, upgrading it from folk instrumentations to full modern orchestral versions, and making it palatable to international audiences.

Track listing

1966 albums
Aldemaro Romero albums
RCA Victor albums
Albums produced by Aldemaro Romero